Fictionalized portrayals of George W. Bush, the 43rd President of the United States, have become common since his inauguration on January 20, 2001. Many popular TV shows, magazines, books, and comics have portrayed or satirized him.

Several comedians and comic actors were known for impressions of Bush during his presidency, including Will Ferrell and Will Forte (both originally on Saturday Night Live), Jon Culshaw, Frank Caliendo, James Adomian and Jon Stewart. Impressionist Steve Bridges had a notably involved impression that included facial prosthetics to achieve similarity to Bush; he impersonated Bush in a variety of settings, including once alongside the real President Bush at the 2006 White House Correspondents' Association dinner. Actor Timothy Bottoms portrayed Bush fictionally multiple times during the Bush presidency: in the Comedy Central sitcom That's My Bush!, as a cameo in the family film The Crocodile Hunter: Collision Course, and in a serious role in the telefilm DC 9/11 (2003).

Bush was the target of satire for most of his presidency. Most fictional depictions of the President in popular media tend to emphasize his drawl and tendency to use incorrect grammar and malapropisms in speeches, as well as his sometimes awkward hand and facial gestures. Bush is often depicted in caricatures with a large nose and ears, and small eyes, giving him a somewhat elfin or chimpanzee-like appearance. He is also sometimes drawn in political cartoons as being short in stature although, in reality, he is taller than the average American.

Most fictionalized portrayals of George W. Bush have been negative.

Film

W.
Bush was portrayed by Josh Brolin in W., a biographical film by Oliver Stone. The film is similar in format to Nixon, another film by Stone, covering Bush's life from his early childhood and college years, to his early political career and struggles with alcoholism, to his 2003 invasion of Iraq. W. was released on October 17, 2008, and is the first time a major motion picture has been made about a U.S. President while he was still in office.

Dasavathaaram
Dasavathaaram (2008) is an Indian film that stars popular Indian actor Kamal Haasan. He dons ten different roles in this film and one of those is the portrayal of George W. Bush.

My Name Is Khan
In the 2010 Indian film My Name Is Khan, Bush is an unseen character who refuses to meet with Khan and accept that the protagonist is not a terrorist.

Death of a President
Bush is the target of assassination in Chicago, Illinois in this fictional tale during his presidency. Death of a President mirrors similar details surrounding the assassination attempt on Ronald Reagan during the early 1980s. Facing broad unpopular support for the 2003 invasion of Iraq, he becomes the target of an assassin with a political agenda.

Harold and Kumar Escape from Guantanamo Bay
In Harold & Kumar Escape from Guantanamo Bay, the 2008 sequel to Harold & Kumar Go to White Castle, Bush is portrayed by James Adomian in a scene where he smokes cocaine-laced marijuana with the title characters.

The Crocodile Hunter: Collision Course
The 2002 action-comedy film The Crocodile Hunter: Collision Course featured a cameo by Timothy Bottoms as President Bush.

DC 9/11: Time of Crisis
In 2004, Showtime broadcast a made-for-television movie titled DC 9/11: Time of Crisis reenacting the September 11, 2001 attacks from the point of view of President Bush.  The movie was a drama, and reviewers stated that its portrayal of George W. Bush, again by Bottoms, was generally in a positive light.

The Master of Disguise
In the film The Master of Disguise, the main character (played by Dana Carvey) dresses up as Bush and comments "Folks around here call me W."

Scary Movie 4
In Scary Movie 4, the President of the United States is reading a children's book in a classroom, similar to George W. Bush's reading of The Pet Goat. When he is told the nation is under the attack (similar to Bush during the September 11 attacks) of alien "triPods" he replies: "Right now I want to hear what happened to the duckling" (in a spoof of Bush's reaction to the attacks).

Transformers
In the 2007 Transformers film, the president is not stated to be Bush but heavily implied to be him. However, in the direct sequel Transformers: Revenge of the Fallen, the reference to the actual President, Barack Obama, as well as brief glimpses of Bush in a news broadcast suggests that the president shown in the original is in fact, President Bush. He is shown lying in bed (with his face obscured by his feet from the camera's point of view) saying to one of the flight attendants (with a Bush-like voice, a heavy southern accent and Bush-style laughter), "Hey, could you wrangle me up some Ding Dongs?" The Secretary of Defense, played by Jon Voight, has him guarded in a bunker for his protection during the rest of the film.

Postal
In the comedy movie Postal, Bush is portrayed by Brent Mendenhall.

Lange Flate Ballær II
In the 2008 Norwegian comedy sequel Lange Flate Ballær 2, after the main characters (Petter, Øyvind, Edgar, Karsten, Kai and Freddy) have prevented an American nuclear submarine from exploding and thus save the world, Bush (played by Steve Bridges) pays them a visit at their garage in Fredrikstad, Norway.

Megumi
George W. Bush appears briefly in a still animated frame of the anime version of Megumi.

American Made
Connor Trinneer plays a young George Bush in the 2017 film American Made.

Vice
Sam Rockwell plays George W. Bush in the 2018 film Vice, for which he received a nomination for the Academy Award for Best Supporting Actor.

Malesh Ehna Benetbahdel
Bush was portrayed by Brent Mendenhall in Malesh Ehna Benetbahdel, a 2005 Egyptian film. Bush appliers as the president of the United States, who wants Karmouti (Ahmad Adam) to falsely admit of doing terrorist attacks and dealing with weapons of mass destruction for Russia.

Animated television

2DTV
2DTV (a UK satire cartoon) regularly portrayed George W. Bush as a childish simpleton who would often make hazardous decisions while in the Oval Office. The character would not listen to advice from his advisor, the General, unless he put a sock on his hand and humoured Bush like a child. These segments were extremely popular in the United Kingdom and highlighted Bush's unpopularity in the country.

In early 2003, an advertisement for the video compilation The Best of 2DTV was prevented from airing in the UK. The advertisement involved Bush taking the compilation cassette out of its case and putting it in a toaster. It was banned because the British advertising watchdog stated that advertisements for products cannot appear to be endorsed by someone without their permission – in this case George W. Bush. This decision was later overturned (due to it being legitimate satire) and the commercial was shown unedited. The makers later said that this generated more publicity than the actual advertisement could ever have produced.

The makers of 2DTV also made another short Bush sketch, in which he writes a letter, resenting his portrayal in the media as a moron. He then places the letter in a toaster.

Family Guy and American Dad!
On Family Guy, Bush has been shown in multiple episodes, doing things like showing up late for duty in the Vietnam War in the episode "PTV" and hiding in his Texas treehouse to avoid news of Hurricane Katrina in "The Fat Guy Strangler". In "Don't Make Me Over", Peter Griffin is chosen to perform for him at the White House. He acts like a clown, causing Bush to laugh childishly until he knocks over a snow globe, causing him to cry equally childishly. In "Saving Private Brian", Stewie Griffin enlists himself and Brian Griffin to the US Army, and both are sent to fight in Iraq. They are trying to be discharged when all of a sudden, democracy kicks in exactly as Bush predicted, allowing them to go home. Stewie says he wishes to know who is the genius behind that war plan. The episode then cuts to a scene of Bush pushing a Slinky down a set of stairs in the White House. After failing the first attempt to make the toy go down all of the steps, he succeeds in his second try, and exclaims, "Laura... Laura!".

The most recent appearance of Bush on Family Guy was on the episode "Excellence in Broadcasting," in which Bush runs into the room in a childish manner and jumps into Rush Limbaugh's arms while saying many childish things. Limbaugh then proceeds to give him a lollipop and he runs off.   

Bush has been cited as the inspiration for the long-running adult animated series American Dad! When asked what first sparked the idea for American Dad! Seth MacFarlane answered, "It was right after the [2000] election, and me and co-creator Matt Weitzman were so frustrated with the Bush administration that we would just spend days bitching and complaining, and we figured we should channel this into something creative and hopefully profitable." The series has even had an episode titled "Bush Comes to Dinner" in which then-President Bush appears, presented as a buffoon.

King of the Hill
In the King of the Hill episode "The Perils of Polling", which aired shortly before the 2000 election, Hank Hill meets then-Governor Bush of Texas, only to be deeply disappointed by his limp handshake. As a result, Hank plans to boycott the polls, but in the end, changes his mind and decides to vote. This is a rare positive portrayal of the President.

Lil' Bush
Lil' Bush is an animated political satire/sitcom from creator Donick Cary. It debuted on Comedy Central on June 13, 2007. Instead of portraying George W. Bush as the current president, Lil' Bush is shown as the son of President George H. W. Bush, portrayed as the current president. Lil' Bush and his friends (Lil' Cheney, Lil' Condi, etc.) all attend an elementary school with other current political figures.

Robot Chicken
George W. Bush was portrayed on the Star Wars special of the stop-motion animation show Robot Chicken aired on Cartoon Network. In the short sketch, an action figure version of the president was shown as dreaming that he had Jedi powers, as well as fighting former U.S. president Abraham Lincoln with a lightsaber and chopping off his daughter Jenna's finger in a parody of famous scenes from Star Wars. He uses Jedi mind tricks to get a parking place and get his wife Laura to have a menage a trois with him and Condoleezza Rice.

In another episode, "Tapping a Hero", Bush comes into possession of a mogwai and proceeds to do everything he was instructed not to do with it (i.e. get it wet, feed it past midnight, etc.).  Eventually, one of the clones gets a hold of the nuclear launch codes, and destroys the world.

Bush is voiced by Seth Green.

The Simpsons
During his term as governor of Texas, Bush was satirized on The Simpsons episode "Two Bad Neighbors" when his parents George and Barbara move in across the street from the Simpsons and Homer and Bart Simpson trick the elder Bush into answering the door with two cardboard cutouts of George W. and Jeb Bush. According to the show's creators, they were unaware that George and Barbara Bush's eldest son was actually named George and said that the term "George Bush, Jr." was intended to be a joke about the stupidity of Homer and Bart's plans. In a reference to the same episode, Homer has a photo album, stating "Here's me beating up former President Bush, here's me beating up current President Bush, and here's me showing a sack of apples who's boss." In The Father, The Son, and the Holy Guest Star, while Bush isn't directly referenced by name, Homer makes a passing reference to a "Commander Cuckoo Bananas" causing a lot of American military quagmires, which serves as a thinly veiled metaphor for Bush.

South Park

South Park displayed the character of George W. Bush in multiple episodes. He is first seen briefly in the episode "Super Best Friends" standing alongside animated portrayals of the cast of That's My Bush! In "A Ladder to Heaven", he tries to wage a war against Saddam Hussein, who, in South Park'''s continuity, is a spirit kicked out of Hell and dwelling unwillingly in Heaven. Bush recollects the history of Saddam's character in the show's continuity to the United Nations. Bush later appears, albeit briefly, in "South Park is Gay!", where the cast from Queer Eye for the Straight Guy give him a makeover as part of an evil plan for world domination.

Bush is later shown with an updated look in the two-part episode "Cartoon Wars Part I" and "Cartoon Wars Part II", where he attempts to stop a cartoon depicting the Prophet Mohammed from airing for fear of terrorist retaliation. When he fails and the show is broadcast, Ayman al-Zawahiri makes a "retaliation" cartoon that depicts him and other Americans defecating on Jesus and the American flag.

Bush is also seen in "Mystery of the Urinal Deuce", which deals with 9/11 conspiracy theories. In this episode, he reveals to Stan and Kyle Broflovski that all the theories are true, and that he and his administration carried out the 9/11 attacks to invade Iraq. By the end of the episode, however, it is revealed that this was a lie and that all the conspiracy theories were actually made up by his administration so that the government would seem all-powerful. He also had a final, brief cameo in "The Snuke," which deals with an attempted terrorist attack by a bomb planted in Hillary Clinton's vagina.

He was at one point set to appear in "About Last Night..." and was to take the blame for the Hope Diamond heist (performed by Barack Obama and John McCain in the episode) in a spoof of Ocean's Eleven. The show's creators, Trey Parker and Matt Stone, cut the scene because they considered Bush a "dead man walking". In the episode, although the White House and even the Oval Office are seen, Bush is missing and never referred to.

Time Squad
Bush made an appearance in an episode of the 2001–2003 animated series Time Squad, trying to make the biggest ball of twine in the world to "bring America together". Bush's father George H. W. Bush made an appearance as well.

Sons of Butcher
In the Canadian animated series Sons of Butcher, in the episode "Payin' The Bills", Bush is seen playing video games with two other politicians in his office.  When told of an army forming in the fictional country of Afghanaraq (where Sol was at the time), he decided to launch a missile there, but pushes the wrong button, thereby launching a missile to Aljania by mistake (after pressing the button, he said "I love doing that").  When he realizes what he did, he simply laughs and says "oops" before he hits the right button, thereby launching a missile in the right country.

Live action television

Kopspijkers
In Kopspijkers, a Dutch public television talk show, Thomas van Luyn as President Bush was set before a fictional press and sang an edited version of the song "Always on My Mind".

Late Late Show with Craig Ferguson
Comedian James Adomian has appeared frequently as George W. Bush on The Late Late Show with Craig Ferguson since Ferguson began hosting the program in 2005. Sketches often include Bush (Adomian) being interviewed by Craig Ferguson or appearing next to Ferguson at a mock press conference.

Dead Ringers
On the BBC British comedy impression show Dead Ringers, Bush was a recurring target for satire, being portrayed by Jon Culshaw. The parodies of Bush put emphasis and exaggeration on the concept of Bushisms, general ignorance, and lampooned malapropisms, such as "My fellow Abbytitmuses, this is your Sterident speaking..." and "I want Osama Bin Laden capturised alive or dead or both!".

MADtv
For several seasons, Bush was portrayed by Frank Caliendo on MADtv. Usually, he's portrayed as a simple-minded fool. Since Caliendo left the show in 2006, Bush was played by James Adomian in voiceover parts. Bush was also played by Christian Duguay during the show's sixth season. During Will Sasso's five-year tenure with the show, he also played George W. Bush.

Saturday Night Live
During the 2000 campaign and first year of his presidency, Bush was portrayed on Saturday Night Live by Will Ferrell, who emphasized the innocent, childlike aspect of the character (in one skit Jeb Bush (played by Val Kilmer) gives George a toy to play with so he can talk with Al Gore). Ferrell played Bush from 1999 to 2002, until he departed from the show. Cast member Chris Parnell took over the portrayal of Bush when Ferrell left. Since Parnell's impression was not as popular as Ferrell's, cast member Darrell Hammond was selected to replace him as Bush in late 2003. Hammond made only two appearances as Bush and was replaced by cast member Will Forte in 2004.  Forte chose to portray Bush as less innocent and more nervous. Although Forte's portrayal was far more popular than either Parnell's or Hammond's, it was never as well-received as Ferrell's. Newer cast member Jason Sudeikis took over the role from Forte in 2006 for unexplained reasons. Will Ferrell reprised the role when he hosted.

That's My Bush!That's My Bush! was a short-lived live-action political satire/sitcom from South Park creators Trey Parker and Matt Stone. It aired on Comedy Central in its first run from April through June 2001. Despite being about the fictional exploits of the president, it instead mostly satirized the 1970s, 1980s, and workplace sitcoms; indeed, it was originally pitched as being about Al Gore, implying that jokes about George Bush were never really meant to be the show's main feature. The show often portrayed Bush dealing with both a sitcom-type situation and a political one at the same time, such as having a romantic dinner with Laura the same night as a major dinner with both sides of the abortion debate. George W. Bush was generally portrayed as being foolish (as were most of the characters) yet essentially honest in his efforts. The show was eventually canceled due to high production costs and insufficient ratings.
After the attacks of September 11, Comedy Central stopped showing reruns of the show.  The complete series was released on DVD in 2006.

World Wrestling Entertainment
On the December 18 edition of WWE Raw, a George W. Bush impersonator entered the ring in aid of Cryme Tyme, an African American tag team. Though Cryme Tyme were faces in the WWE, meaning they are supposed to be cheered, Bush himself was booed by the live crowd. The impersonation sketch they performed referenced multiple African American celebrities, including Kanye West as well as Bush Administration officials Colin Powell and Condoleezza Rice. At one point, the Bush character confused George Jefferson for Thomas Jefferson, claiming that the Jeffersons character had written the Declaration of Independence. He then began to say "You know he's my nigga," before being interrupted by Cryme Tyme in the middle of the last word. At the end of the sketch, Cryme Tyme stole Bush's wallet, and in return, Bush started to yell "Arrest those niggers," before again catching himself in mid-word and following up with "Arrest those people." Cryme Tyme was not apprehended, however. Bush then turned at the end of the entrance ramp before exiting the arena and flipped off the crowd.

Mr. Deity
In the episode "Mr. Deity and the Intel" of Mr. Deity George W. Bush is portrayed by Louie Sadd, where Mr. Deity (God) is discussing the 2003 War On Terror with Bush, but Deity doesn't understand him that well and does not really know what would happen with the war.

Off-the-cuff impersonations
Often, when a story involving George W. Bush is shown on The Daily Show, host Jon Stewart hunches his shoulders, squints his eyes, talks in a voice similar to Bush's, and uses strange hand gestures, occasionally accompanied by Beavis and Butt-head-style laughing.

Comics
Doonesbury

In the political comic Doonesbury, President George W. Bush was symbolized by a Stetson hat atop a giant asterisk.  The hat referred to his time spent as Governor of Texas; Doonesbury artist Garry Trudeau refers to Bush as being "all hat and no cattle". The asterisk was intended to represent the special circumstances surrounding Bush's election, it being the typical symbol to mark footnoted special circumstances in any standard record book.

Later, President Bush's symbol was changed to a Roman military helmet (again, atop an asterisk) representing imperialism. Towards the end of his first term, the helmet became battered, with the gilt work starting to come off and with clumps of bristles missing from the top, but on September 2, 2006, he fantasized about himself wearing a crown.

Starting on November 2, 2010, Roland Hedley began interviewing President Bush for Fox News.  The interview was in anticipation of the release of Bush's memoir, Decision Points, which was due to be released on November 9.  At that point, the asterisk remained but nearly all of the Roman helmet was gone.  All that remained was the crest holder (sans crest) which was so badly battered that it resembled an all-in-one assembly of Allen wrenches.

If...
In his political comic strip If..., English cartoonist Steve Bell depicts President Bush as a chimpanzee. Bell first drew Bush as a chimpanzee in a cartoon on his inauguration, as a reference to the 1951 film Bedtime for Bonzo starring Ronald Reagan. Bell later explained that he originally did not intend to continue depicting Bush as a chimpanzee, but eventually come to find the portrayal very fitting after studying Bush's body language.

Ultimates
Bush also appears in a cameo during the first volume of Marvel comics "The Ultimates". While no commentary was made on his policies, the President did seem flustered as he spoke to the then-recently awoken and fairly impressive Captain America. He shows up again in the second volume of The Ultimates where he is captured by an anti-American superhero group called The Liberators. Seeing how having the Ultimates working with the United States government "policing" the world would produce similar results to their battle against the Liberators, the team decided to leave the government behind and continue to work as an independent team instead.

Ultimate X-Men
Bush was also portrayed in Ultimate X-Men. He becomes an ally to the X-Men after they rescue his daughter from Magneto's Brotherhood of Mutants. After Magneto attacked America, he was stripped naked by him and forced to lick his boots clean while on live TV. Afterward, Magneto attempted to drop a car on him but was stopped when the X-Men intervened. The car's license plate read "DUBYA".

Twisted Kaiju Theater
In the popular webcomic Twisted Kaiju Theater, Bush is a recurring villain. Here is depicted is a childish simpleton who cries when he loses. He is also obsessed with oil, attempting to obtain Neo Monster Islands oil at literally any cost. He also says that non-Christians have no souls, believes that same-sex marriage is a threat to America, and his motto is, "Fuck the poor" (a parody of his alleged hostility to working-class citizens).

Video games

ESPN NFL Football
If the player creates a player with the name "George Bush" in the video game ESPN NFL 2K5'', his full name will be announced during gameplay.

See also
List of presidents of the United States
Will Ferrell
James Adomian
Will Forte
Frank Caliendo
Steve Bridges
Strategery

References